Parmastomyces is a genus of fungi in the family Fomitopsidaceae. The genus was circumscribed by Czech mycologists František Kotlaba and Zdenek Pouzar in 1964, with Tyromyces kravtzevianus Bondartzev & Parm. as the type species. Parmastomyces species cause a brown rot. The genus has a monomitic hyphal system.

The genus name of Parmastomyces is in honour of Erast Parmasto (1928–2012), who was an Estonian mycologist, bio-scientist and botanist and onetime director of the Estonian Institute of Zoology and Botany. 

The genus was circumscribed by Paul Claude Silva in Taxon vol.8 on page 63 in 1959.

Species
Parmastomyces corticola Corner (1989)
Parmastomyces deceptivus Corner (1989)
Parmastomyces glutinosus Corner (1989)
Parmastomyces kravtzevianus (Bondartsev & Parmasto) Kotl. & Pouzar (1964) – Europe
Parmastomyces mollissimus (Maire) Pouzar (1984) – Europe
Parmastomyces taxi (Bondartsev) Y.C.Dai & Niemelä (1995)
Parmastomyces umbrinus Corner (1989)

References

Fomitopsidaceae
Polyporales genera
Taxa described in 1964